Initiated in 2005, the global Henry Hope Reed Award or short Reed Award is given to an individual working outside the practice of architecture who has supported the cultivation of the traditional city, its architecture and art through writing, planning or promotion. It is awarded in conjunction with the Driehaus Architecture Prize at the Notre Dame School of Architecture. It is named in honor of architecture critic Henry Hope Reed Jr.

The award winner receives a bronze medal showing a bas relief cameo of Reed, surrounded by laurel. It was custom designed by P.E. Guerin, the oldest decorative hardware firm in the United States.

The prize was first presented on March 19 in 2005 at the University Club of Chicago, to Henry Hope Reed.

Laureates
The 2018 Reed Award was received by the chair of the Society for Rebuilding Dresden's New Market (GHND) in Germany, Torsten Kulke.

The 2020 Reed Award was given to Clem Labine, the creator of the Palladio Award, which recognizes excellence in traditional design, and the eponymous Clem Labine Award for creating more humane and beautiful environments.

The historian of US American urban planning John Reps is posthumously awarded the Reed Award in 2021, being known for his iconic book The Making of Urban America (1965) among other influential research groundwork.

The list of laureates:

See also
Richard H. Driehaus Prize
Notre Dame School of Architecture

References

External links
The Henry Hope Reed Award
Introduction video of the Reed Award
The Richard H. Driehaus Prize at the University of Notre Dame
University of Notre Dame School of Architecture

Architecture awards
Awards established in 2005
2005 establishments in Indiana
New Classical architecture
Awards and prizes of the University of Notre Dame